Thomas Fox may refer to:

Politicians
 Thomas Fox (1622–1666), English MP for Tamworth 1660–1661
 Thomas Fox (elected 1406), MP for Nottingham
 Tom Fox (Australian politician) (1876–1951), Australian politician and football player
 Tom Fox (British politician) (1860–1934), English trade unionist and politician
Thomas Fox (Leicester MP), represented Leicester (UK Parliament constituency)

Sportspeople
 Thomas Fox (cricketer, born 1849) (1849–1916), English cricketer and botanist
 Thomas Fox (Middlesex cricketer) (1878–1931), English cricketer
 Thomas Fox (rower) (1928–2010), Guernsey-born doctor and rower 
 Tom Fox (executive), former chief executive of Aston Villa F.C.
 Tom Fox (rugby league), rugby league footballer of the 1930s
 Tom Fox (hurler), Irish hurler

Others
Thomas Fox (priest), English priest
 Tom Fox (baritone), American opera singer
 Tom Fox (Quaker) (1951–2006), American Quaker killed in Iraq while serving with Christian Peacemaker Teams
 Tom Fox, founder and president of New York Water Taxi
 Thomas C. Fox, journalist and publisher for the National Catholic Reporter
 Dredger Tom Fox

See also
 Tom Foxe (1937–2000), Irish politician
 Tinker Fox (1610–1650), Colonel John Fox, English Parliamentarian Soldier, erroneously referred to as Thomas Fox by some sources
 Thomas Fox Averill (born 1949), American writer